Yanzhuang is a town under the administration of Yuanping City in northern Shanxi province, China, located about  southwest of downtown Yuanping. , it has 22 villages under its administration.

See also 
 List of township-level divisions of Shanxi

References 

Township-level divisions of Shanxi